Karon Lynn Owen Bowdre (born April 25, 1955) is a Senior United States district judge of the United States District Court for the Northern District of Alabama.

Early life and education
Born in Montgomery, Alabama, Bowdre graduated from Samford University with her Bachelor of Arts degree in 1977 and later from Cumberland School of Law at Samford University with a Juris Doctor in 1981.

Legal career
She was a law clerk for Junius Foy Guin, Jr. of the United States District Court for the Northern District of Alabama from 1981 to 1982. Bowdre was a partner at the Birmingham, Alabama, firm of Rives & Peterson from 1982 to 1990. Beginning in 1989, Bowdre became  a full-time Professor of law at Samford University Cumberland School of Law where she taught insurance law, legal ethics, and professional responsibility, and directed Cumberland’s legal research and writing program before her federal appointment in 2001.

Federal judicial service
On September 4, 2001, Bowdre was nominated to the United States District Court for the Northern District of Alabama by President George W. Bush. She was nominated to the seat vacated by Sam Clyde Pointer Jr. Bowdre was confirmed by the Senate on November 6, 2001, and received her commission on November 8, 2001. She served as Chief Judge of the United States District Court for the Northern District of Alabama from November 18, 2013 to December 31, 2019. She assumed senior status on April 25, 2020.

References

External links

1955 births
Living people
21st-century American judges
Cumberland School of Law alumni
Judges of the United States District Court for the Northern District of Alabama
Lawyers from Montgomery, Alabama
Samford University alumni
United States district court judges appointed by George W. Bush
21st-century American women judges